The 2019–20 season will be the 90th season of competitive football by Petrolul Ploiești, and the 2nd in Liga II after an absence of 7 years, finishing fourth in the previous year. Petrolul Ploiești will compete in the Liga II and in Cupa României. The season covers the period from 1 July 2019 to 30 June 2020.

Previous season positions

Players

First team squad

Loans out

Competitions

Overview

Liga II

The Liga II fixture list was announced in July 2019.

League table

Results by round

Matches

Cupa Romaniei

Statistics

Appearances and goals

|-
! colspan=14 style="background:#f9e700; color:#304da1; text-align:center"| Goalkeepers

|-
! colspan=14 style="background:#f9e700; color:#304da1; text-align:center"| Defenders

|-
! colspan=14 style="background:#f9e700; color:#304da1; text-align:center"| Midfielders

|-
! colspan=14 style="background:#f9e700; color:#304da1; text-align:center"| Forwards

|-
! colspan=14 style="background:#f9e700; color:#304da1; text-align:center"| Players transferred out during the season

Goalscorers

Last updated: August 2019

Clean sheets

Last updated: August 2019

Youth program

FC Petrolul Ploiești U19

Managers

Current squad

Competitions

Campionatul Național U19

References

External links

 
 
 
 Club profile on UEFA's official website

 
Romanian football clubs 2019–20 season